Ali Özdemir (1923 – 22 April 2009) was a Turkish wrestler. He competed at the 1948 Summer Olympics and the 1952 Summer Olympics.

References

External links
 

1923 births
2009 deaths
Turkish male sport wrestlers
Olympic wrestlers of Turkey
Wrestlers at the 1948 Summer Olympics
Wrestlers at the 1952 Summer Olympics
Place of birth missing
World Wrestling Championships medalists